Benton's Row is a 1954 historical novel by the American writer Frank Yerby. It was ranked tenth on the Publishers Weekly list of bestselling novels that year. It was one of several of his books set in nineteenth century Louisiana. It follows the progress of four generations of the Benton family culminating in World War 1.

References

Bibliography
 Bonner Jr., John W. Bibliography of Georgia Authors, 1949-1965. University of Georgia Press, 2010.
 Davis, Thadious M. Southscapes: Geographies of Race, Region, and Literature. University of North Carolina Press, 2011.
 Korda, Michael. Making the List: A Cultural History of the American Bestseller, 1900–1999 : as Seen Through the Annual Bestseller Lists of Publishers Weekly. Barnes & Noble Publishing, 2001.

1954 American novels
American historical novels
Novels by Frank Yerby
Dial Press books
Novels set in the 19th century
Novels set in Louisiana
Novels set in the 1910s